Calenia is a genus of lichen-forming fungi within the family Gomphillaceae.

Species
 Calenia atlantica 
 Calenia bullatinoides 
 Calenia chroodisciformis 
 Calenia corticola 
 Calenia depressa 
 Calenia echinoplacoides 
 Calenia flava 
 Calenia flavescens  – China
 Calenia fumosa 
 Calenia graphidea 
 Calenia leptocarpa 
 Calenia lueckingii  – Costa Rica
 Calenia obtecta 
 Calenia pernambucensis 
 Calenia phyllogena 
 Calenia pseudographidea 
 Calenia subdepressa 
 Calenia surinamensis 
 Calenia thelotremella 
 Calenia verrucosa  – China

References

Ostropales
Lichen genera
Ostropales genera
Taxa named by Johannes Müller Argoviensis
Taxa described in 1890